Gilbert is a town in Maricopa County, Arizona, United States, located southeast of Phoenix within the city's metropolitan area. Incorporated on July 6, 1920, Gilbert was once known as the "Hay Shipping Capital of the World". It is the fifth-largest municipality in Arizona, and the fourth-largest in the Phoenix metro area.

Gilbert has made a rapid transformation from an agriculture-based community to an economically diverse suburban center located in the southeastern valley of the Greater Phoenix area. It has grown at an extremely high rate over the last three decades, increasing in population from 5,717 in 1980 to 267,918 as of the 2020 census. The town grew at an average annual rate of over 10% during this 40-year period. It is the largest incorporated town in the United States.

History
Gilbert was established by William "Bobby" Gilbert, who provided land to the Arizona Eastern Railway in 1902 to construct a rail line between Phoenix and Florence, Arizona. Ayer's Grocery Store, the first store in Gilbert, opened in 1910 and became the location of the first post office in 1912. The location of the town post office moved several times before settling on the east side of Gilbert Road in downtown, where it still stands today. In 1912, many Mormons who had fled the Mormon colonies in Mexico due to the actions of the forces of Pancho Villa settled in Gilbert. By 1915, they began holding church meetings at the Gilbert Elementary School. In 1918, they were organized into the Gilbert Ward.

Incorporated in July 1920, Gilbert was primarily a farming community fueled by the rail line and construction of the Roosevelt Dam and the Eastern and Consolidated Canals. It remained an agricultural town for many years and was known as the "Hay Capital of the World" from 1911 until the late 1920s.

In 2019, the town ranked highly on three national surveys, related to safety, livability and family life; it was named the fourth-safest (of 182 communities), twelfth-most livable town, and seventh-best place to raise a family in the United States.

Geography
Gilbert is located in the southeast portion of the Phoenix metropolitan area. It is south of Mesa, northeast of Chandler, and northwest of Queen Creek.

Climate
Gilbert has a subtropical, hot desert type of climate (Köppen climate classification BWh) with dry and hot summers, and mild to warm winters, with little rainfall.

Demographics

As of the census of 2010, there were 208,453 people, 74,147 housing units, and 3.01 persons per household.

 Between 2000 and 2010, the town of Gilbert was the fastest-growing incorporated place among populations of 100,000 or more in the United States, with an increase of 90.0 percent.

 Fastest growing municipality in the United States from 1990 to 2003 (U.S. Census Bureau)
 4th fastest growing municipality in the United States (U.S. Census Bureau – 2009)
 Ranked by CNN's Money magazine in 2008 as one of the best places to live in the United States
 One of the top 25 safest cities in the United States
 34.5% of Gilbert residents hold a bachelor's degree or higher.
 Highest household median income in the Phoenix Metropolitan Area with population 50,000+ (U.S. Census Bureau – 2005)

According to Nielsen's Claritas demographics, in 2009 the estimated racial makeup of the town was:
 81.5% White
 15.4% Hispanics or Latinos
 3.1% Black or African American
 0.8% Native American
 4.7% Asian
 0.2% Pacific Islander
 6.0% from other races
 3.7% from two or more races

2009 estimated population data by gender/age:
 31.37 average age male/female. By 2019, the average age was reported as 33.6.
 50.2% male
 30.0 est. average age
 49.8% female
 31.8 est. average age
 37.1% population under 21
 33.3% population under 18
 70.0% population over 16
 66.8% population over 18
 62.9% population over 21
 5.3% population over 65

2009 estimated population age 15+ by marital status:
 20.9% never married
 66.7% married, spouse present
 2.2% married, spouse absent
 2.1% widowed
 8.1% divorced

2009 estimated population age 25+ educational attainment:
 92.3% high school/GED or higher
 37.5% bachelor's degree or higher. A 2019 report put the rate at close to 50% for residents over the age of 25.
 10.5% master's degree or higher

2009 estimated household by household income:
 $109,213 average household income
 $89,077 median household income. Median income noted as >$87,000 in a report of 2013–2017 US Census data, as compared to a state-wide median of $53,000.
 $35,559 per capita Income
 2.3% of families were below the poverty level

Religion
Various religious denominations are represented in Gilbert. The town has been known for its high population of members of the Church of Jesus Christ of Latter-day Saints, a fact evidenced by the building of the Gilbert Arizona Temple, which was dedicated on March 2, 2014.

Economy

Largest employers
According to the town's 2013 Comprehensive Annual Financial Report, the top employers in the city are:

Additional employers noted in a 2019 report were Dignity Health, employing about 1,000; and Isagenix International, a marketing company employing >700.

Arts and culture

9/11 Memorial
Gilbert is home to a 9/11 Memorial, located at Town Hall that features an eight-foot steel girder beam which held up the North Tower of the World Trade Center. Former Gilbert Fire Chief Collin DeWitt fund-raised extensively for three years to create the memorial, and to bring the beam from New York City to Arizona. He drove to collect it himself along with his then Assistant Fire Chief Jim Jobusch.

The design of the memorial angles the beam, which puts it in reach of everyone. Four granite walls bear the names of those lost to the attacks. Concrete was poured in the shape of a pentagon for the foundation of the memorial, and is surrounded by bricks which carry names of some of those who helped to donate to bring the memorial to life. There was an unveiling ceremony of the memorial on the 10th anniversary of the attack on September 11, 2011.

Historic place
Gilbert Elementary School was built in 1913, and now houses the Gilbert Historical Museum. It is listed in the National Register of Historic Places.

Parks and recreation
Gilbert Regional Park and Desert Sky Park were established in 2019 with multi-million dollar investments.

The Freestone Recreation Center, north of Freestone Park, was opened in 2002. It has a rock wall, a gymnasium, a steam room and dry sauna, and exercise equipment.

Government
Gilbert was recognized in 2010 as the "36th Best Place to Live in the nation", as well as among the nation's "top places to live and learn", by GreatSchools.org. Washington, DC-based CQ Press rated Gilbert the "safest municipality in Arizona, and 25th safest in the nation."

Since Gilbert remains incorporated as a town, it lacks the additional powers possessed by nearby Mesa and Chandler, which are incorporated as cities. For instance, Arizona towns do not have as much power to regulate utilities and construction within their borders as cities possess. Unlike most of its neighboring communities, Gilbert is theoretically vulnerable to annexation.

The mayor of Gilbert is Brigette Peterson.

Education
Most of Gilbert is zoned to schools in the Gilbert Public Schools, while other portions are zoned to districts including the Chandler Unified School District, Mesa Public Schools, and the Higley Unified School District. Also in Gilbert are charter schools such as Eduprize (the first charter school in Arizona), American Leadership Academy, and Legacy Traditional School. The town is also home to Gilbert Christian Schools, a chain of private schools. In 2018, the Park University opened the Gilbert Campus Center after leasing  at the University Building in the city's Heritage District.

Infrastructure

Transportation

Gilbert is primarily served by one area freeway—the Santan Freeway portion of Loop 202. A small section of the US 60 Superstition Freeway also skirts the northern boundary of the town at the Higley Road interchange (Exit 186). Several regional arterials also serve the area, including Williams Field Road, Chandler Boulevard, and Gilbert Road. The town enjoys relative closeness to Phoenix Mesa Gateway Airport, which is located in east Mesa, and is a 25-minute drive from Phoenix Sky Harbor International Airport.

Recently, a park-and-ride facility was constructed in downtown Gilbert for bus service and future commuter rail service. Although the facility borders the Union Pacific (formerly Southern Pacific) tracks and has provisions for commuter rail service, there is currently no such service. Bus service is limited in Gilbert, with some north–south routes in Mesa dead-ending at Baseline Road before entering Gilbert. Routes that serve portions of Gilbert include the 108-Elliot Road, 112-Country Club/Arizona Avenue, 136-Gilbert Road, 140-Ray Road, 156-Chandler Boulevard/Williams Field Road, 184-Power Road, and 531-Mesa/Gilbert Express, with most of these routes operating at 30-minute frequency on weekdays. Sunday service is only available on Routes 108, 112, 156, and 184. Most people get around by cars or bikes. The city of Gilbert has a low percentage of households without a car. In 2015, 1.9 percent of Gilbert households lacked a car, and the figure was virtually unchanged in 2016 (1.7 percent). The national average was 8.7 percent in 2016. Gilbert averaged 2.08 cars per household in 2016, compared to a national average of 1.8.

In 2018 Waymo started testing in a small portion of the northwest portion of the town of Gilbert.

Historic structures

The following is a brief description of the historic structures which are pictured. Some of these structures are listed in the National Register of Historic Places while others are listed as historical by the Gilbert Heritage District.
 Gilbert Elementary School was built in 1913. It is located at 10 S. Gilbert Rd. and now houses the Gilbert Historical Museum. It is listed in the National Register of Historic Places.
 Gilbert High School was built in 1920. It now houses the Gilbert Public School District Office. The structure is listed as historical by the Gilbert Heritage District.
 The Gilbert Water Tower was built in 1925. The structure is listed as historical by the Gilbert Heritage District.
 Gilbert's First Jail House was built in 1918 and later used as a pump house. The structure is listed as historical by the Gilbert Heritage District.
 The Tone Building was built in 1929 and now houses Joe's Real BBQ Restaurant. The structure is listed as historical by the Gilbert Heritage District.
 Liberty Market was built in 1936. Liberty Market was established by the Ong family. The neon sign which is still on display was designed by Mae Ong, the wife of Ben Ong, who purchased the market in 1943. The structure is listed as historical by the Gilbert Heritage District.
 The Creed building was built in 1918. It now houses the Farmhouse Restaurant. The structure is listed as historical by the Gilbert Heritage District.
 The Attaway Phelps-Blakely Building was built in 1910. It now houses the Norwood Furniture store. The structure is listed as historical by the Gilbert Heritage District.
 The Bank of Gilbert was built in 1917. It now houses an insurance company. The structure is listed as historical by the Gilbert Heritage District.
 Clare's Metal Shop was built in 1918. It now houses Bergies Coffee. The structure is listed as historical by the Gilbert Heritage District.
 Clement's Garage was built in 1934. The structure is listed as historical by the Gilbert Heritage District.
 The American Legion Post 39 was built in 1934.

Notable people
 Jim Bechtel, professional poker player; World Champion of Poker in 1993; lives in Gilbert
 Dave Burba, pitcher for late 1990s Cleveland Indians; lives in Gilbert
 Haley Cavinder, current basketball player at Fresno State and internet personality; grew up in Gilbert and graduated from Gilbert High School
 Marquis Cooper, professional linebacker; played for Highland High School
 Ken Delo, singer best known for The Lawrence Welk Show; lives in Gilbert
 Ryan Fitzpatrick, former NFL quarterback; played for Highland High School
 Jineane Ford, Miss Arizona USA 1980, Miss USA 1980
 Alan Gordon, professional soccer player; raised in Gilbert
 Dan Hausel, Hall of Fame martial artist; resident of Gilbert since 2006
 Shea Hillenbrand, All-Star professional baseball player and rescue farm owner
 Darrin Jackson, professional baseball player, 1985–1999; TV broadcaster; lives in Gilbert
 Kimberly Joiner, Miss Arizona USA 2008; raised in and still lives in Gilbert
 Mina Kimes, ESPN TV personality and journalist; lived in Gilbert during teenage years; attended Mesquite High School
 Naomi Lang, five-time U.S. ice dance champion, 2002 Olympian
 Spencer Larsen, former professional football player; raised in Gilbert; played for Highland High School
 Justin Lassen, artist; lives in Gilbert; graduated from Gilbert High School in 2000
 Ryan Leslie, television personality on MTV's The Real World: New Orleans
 Lydia, band
 Bengie Molina, former Major League Baseball catcher; has lived in Gilbert since 2011
 Alex Naddour, bronze medalist at 2011 World Artistic Gymnastics Championships and in pommel horse at 2016 Summer Olympics; graduate from Highland High School
 Carlos I. Noriega, NASA astronaut; retired United States Marine Corps lieutenant colonel; lives in Gilbert
 Phil Ortega, MLB pitcher, 1960–1969; born in Gilbert in 1939
Brock Purdy, NFL quarterback for the San Francisco 49ers
 MyKayla Skinner, gold medalist at 2014 World Artistic Gymnastics Championships; silver medalist on vault at the 2020 Summer Olmpics
 Lindsey Stirling, violinist, dancer, and performer; Mesquite High School graduate
 Eric Swann, NFL player for Arizona Cardinals; lives in Gilbert
 Rick Woolstenhulme, drummer for band Lifehouse

References

External links

 

 
Phoenix metropolitan area
Populated places in the Sonoran Desert
Towns in Maricopa County, Arizona